Jose Kattukkaran is an Indian National Congress politician from Thrissur City, India, and was the first mayor of Thrissur Municipal Corporation when it was raised to the present status in 2000. He was in office from 5 October 2000, to 3 April 2004.

References

Mayors of Thrissur
Living people
Indian National Congress politicians from Kerala
Year of birth missing (living people)